Mimacanthocinus tonkinensis is a species of beetle in the family Cerambycidae, and the only species in the genus Mimacanthocinus. It was described by Breuning in 1958.

References

Acanthocinini
Beetles described in 1958
Monotypic beetle genera